The 2016 FIA European Rallycross Championship was the 41st season of the FIA European Championships for Rallycross Drivers. The season consisted of nine rounds, commencing on 16 April with the Portuguese round at the Pista Automóvel de Montalegre, and culminating on 16 October in Germany at the Estering.

Calendar

Entries

Supercar

Super1600

TouringCar

Championship Standings

Supercar

1 #147 -10 Championship points penalty Stewards decision No.4.
2 #87 -10 Championship points penalty Stewards decision No.2.
3 #69 -10 Championship points penalty Stewards decision No.4.
4 #12 -30 Championship points penalty Stewards decision.

Super1600

TouringCar

References

External links

European Rallycross Championship seasons
European Rallycross Championship
Rallycross